Hasan Hüseyin Korkmazgil (1927 – 26 February 1984) was a leading Turkish socialist realist poet.

He was born in Gürün, Sivas Province. After completing his studies, he became a teacher. However he was banned from his occupation due to political reasons, which would not leave him alone for a lifetime.

His first poem was published in 1959. His poetry became famous with its notable goodwill, wisdom and social stance and touched on themes varying from social and political problems to pain and hope within life.

Works

Kavel (1963)
Temmuz Bildirisi (1965)
Kızılırmak (1966)
Kızılkuğu (1971)
Ağlasun Ayşafağı (1972)
Oğlak (1972)
Acıyı Bal Eyledik (1973).
Kelepçemin Karasında Bir Ak Güvercin (1974)
Koçero Vatan Şiiri (1976)
Haziran'da Ölmek Zor (1977)
Filizkıran Fırtınası (1981)
Acılara Tutunmak (1981)
Işıklarla Oynamayın (1982)
Tohumlar Tuz İçinde (1988)
Kandan Kına Yakılmaz (1989)

References 

1927 births
People from Gürün
Gazi Eğitim Enstitüsü alumni
Turkish poets
20th-century poets
1984 deaths